Heßheim is a municipality in the Rhein-Pfalz-Kreis, in Rhineland-Palatinate, Germany. It is situated approximately 4 km west of Frankenthal.

Heßheim was the seat of the former Verbandsgemeinde ("collective municipality") Heßheim.

Politics

Municipal Council

Mayor 
The mayor of Heßheim is Holger Korn (SPD).

References

Rhein-Pfalz-Kreis